Stephen Grant (born 14 April 1977) is a former professional footballer who now competes as a professional golfer on the NGA Pro Golf Tour.

During his career he played for Athlone Town, Sunderland, Shamrock Rovers (two stints 154 competitive appearances), Stockport County, Burnley, Finn Harps, Waterford United, Boston Bulldogs, Galway United and Shelbourne.

After playing for Athlone and Sunderland reserves his first taste of senior football came when Pat Byrne signed him for Rovers in October 1996. He became an instant hero by scoring on his League of Ireland debut against fierce rivals Bohemians on the 18th. After 4 goals in 22 total appearances he signed for Stockport for £300,000 in 1997.

He signed back again for Rovers in the summer of 2001 and wrote himself into the history books by becoming the first Irish player to score against a Polish side in European competition when Rovers beat Odra Wodzisław in the UEFA Intertoto Cup in June 2003  In total he made 6 appearances in Europe for Rovers.

In his last season he was Rovers top goalscorer in the 2004 League of Ireland season.

Grant retired from professional football at the relatively early age of 27 to concentrate on a career as a professional golfer. He played on the Challenge Tour in 2012.

Grant joined the Shamrock Rovers Member Club in 2012.

Honours
Leinster Senior Cup
 Shamrock Rovers - 1997

References

External links

1977 births
Living people
Republic of Ireland association footballers
Republic of Ireland under-21 international footballers
Republic of Ireland expatriate association footballers
Irish expatriate sportspeople in the United States
Expatriate footballers in England
Expatriate soccer players in the United States
Association football forwards
Athlone Town A.F.C. players
Shamrock Rovers F.C. players
Finn Harps F.C. players
Waterford F.C. players
Galway United F.C. (1937–2011) players
Shelbourne F.C. players
Sunderland A.F.C. players
Stockport County F.C. players
Burnley F.C. players
League of Ireland players
English Football League players
Boston Bulldogs (soccer) players
Irish male golfers
European Tour golfers
Sportspeople from County Offaly
Irish expatriate sportspeople in England